U-27 may refer to one of the following German submarines:

 , was the lead ship of the Type U 27 class of submarines; launched in 1913 and served in the First World War until sunk on 19 August 1915; the events surrounding U-27s sinking are known as the Baralong Incident
 During the First World War, Germany also had these submarines with similar names:
 , a Type UB II submarine launched in 1915 and sunk on 27 July 1917
 , a Type UC II submarine launched in 1916 and surrendered on 3 February 1919
 , a Type VIIA submarine that served in the Second World War until sunk on 20 September 1939
 , a Type 206 submarine of the Bundesmarine that was launched in 1974 and scrapped in 1996

U-27 or U-XXVII may also refer to:
 , lead boat of the  submarines for the Austro-Hungarian Navy

Submarines of Germany